Kunzea salina is a species of flowering plant in the myrtle family, Myrtaceae and is endemic to the south of Western Australia. It is a low, spreading, densely branched shrub with leaves mostly arranged in opposite pairs and usually two sessile pale pink to white flowers arranged at the base of new shoots. It only grows near the edge of certain salt lakes.

Description
The flowers are usually arranged in pairs, sometimes in groups of up to six at the base of new shoots. The petals are pale pink to white, broadly egg-shaped to almost round and about twice the size of the sepals. There are between sixteen and nineteen stamens arranged in two whorls. Flowering mainly occurs between November and February but depends on rainfall. The fruit is an urn-shaped capsule with the sepal lobes attached.

Taxonomy and naming
This species was first formally described in 1983 by Malcolm Trudgen and Greg Keighery who gave it the name Angasomyrtus salina and published the description in the journal Nuytsia. The genus Angasomyrtus was named after the co-discoverer, Angas Hopkins, who is known for his work on the ecology and conservation of Western Australian flora. Following phylogenetic analyses of DNA sequences, Peter de Lange and Hellmut Toelken changed the name to Kunzea salina. The specific epithet (salina) refers to the saline habitat of this species.

Distribution and habitat
Kunzea salina grows in white sand dunes over clay at the edges of small playa lakes
north of Esperance in the Esperance Plains and Mallee biogeographic regions.

References

salina
Endemic flora of Western Australia
Myrtales of Australia
Rosids of Western Australia
Plants described in 1983
Taxa named by Malcolm Eric Trudgen
Taxa named by Gregory John Keighery